The Olympus E-500 (Olympus EVOLT E-500 in North America) is an 8-megapixel digital SLR camera manufactured by Olympus of Japan and based on the Four Thirds System. It was announced on 26 September 2005. Like the E-300 launched the previous year, it uses a Full Frame Transfer (17.3 x 13 mm) Kodak KAF-8300CE CCD imaging chip.

Features
Unlike the E-300 and the E-300's successor, the Olympus E-330, the E-500 retains the traditional SLR appearance, with a humped pentamirror box instead of the E-300's unique Porro mirror arrangement. The mirror box also bears the onboard flash. The viewfinder hump means the E-500 is taller than the E-300, but in other dimensions it is smaller.

The E-500 uses Olympus' patented Supersonic Wave Filter dust reduction system to shake dust from the sensor during startup and when requested by the user; this largely eliminates the problem of dust accumulation on the surface of the image sensor. Image processing is done with Olympus' TruePic Turbo system.

Improvements over the E-300 include a  rear LCD screen, 49 zone metering (the E-300's total is undocumented, but believed to be 3), spot metering, an RGB histogram to identify clipping across the three color channels in post-shot review, optional improved noise filtering for low-light photography, and the ability to apply software color filters in black-and-white shooting.

In a buyers guide distributed by the UK Digital SLR magazine (December 06, 2nd edition), the Olympus E-500 camera was identified as an intermediate digital SLR camera — capable of functioning as a professional tool in most situations, well above what the average street price of £379 (at time of article) reflects.

The E-500 was available in five different packages in the United States; these were:
 Body only (no lens)
 Body plus 14–45 mm Zuiko Digital lens
 Body plus 17.5–45 mm Zuiko Digital lens
 Body plus 14–45 mm and 40–150 mm Zuiko Digital lenses
 Body plus 17.5–45 mm and 40–150 mm Zuiko Digital lenses (Costco in-store package)

The successor to the E-500 is the E-510. Released in 2007, the E-510 provides several feature improvements including a new 10-megapixel Live MOS Sensor with claimed lower image noise at high ISO compared to the E-500, LiveView and in-body Image Stabilization in approximately the same body size as the E-500.

External links 

 E-500 at Olympus America.
  Full review at DPreview.com.
 Olympus E-500 Sample Photos and Tests

E-500
Four Thirds System
Cameras introduced in 2005